August 4 - Eastern Orthodox liturgical calendar - August 6

All fixed commemorations below are observed on August 18 by Eastern Orthodox Churches on the Old Calendar.

For August 5, Orthodox Churches on the Old Calendar commemorate the Saints listed on July 23.

Feasts

 Forefeast of the Transfiguration of Jesus.

Saints

 Hieromartyrs Antherus (236) and Fabian (Fabianus) (250), Popes of Rome.
 Martyr Pontius, at Cimella in Gaul (257)
 Martyr Eusignius of Antioch (362)
 Righteous Nonna (374), wife of Gregory of Nazianzus the Elder and mother of St. Gregory the Theologian.
 Martyrs Cantidius and Cantidianus, brothers, of Egypt, by stoning (4th century)
 Martyr Sibelius (Sobel) of Egypt, shot by bow and arrow (4th century)
 Saint Therissos (Thyrsos), Bishop of Karpasia, Cyprus.
 Saint Euthymius I, Patriarch of Constantinople (917)

Pre-Schism Western saints

 Saint Memmius (Menge, Meinge), Founder and first Bishop of Châlons-sur-Marne in France, and Apostle of the region (c. 300)
 Twenty-three (23) Martyrs of Rome, on the Salarian Way in Rome, under Diocletian (303)
 Saint Emygdius (Emidius), a saint whose relics were venerated in Ascoli in Italy (c. 303)
 Martyr Afra, in Augsburg in Germany, under Diocletian (c. 304)
 Saint Paris, Bishop of Teano near Naples in Italy (346)
 Saint Cassian of Autun, Bishop of Autun in France, 314-350, he succeeded St Reticius and was famous for his miracles (c. 350)
 Saint Venantius, the most famous of the ancient Bishops of Viviers in France (544)
 Martyr Oswald of Northumbria, King of Northumbria (642)
 Saint Abel of Reims, Archbishop of Rheims in France (c. 751)
 Saint Theodoric, Bishop of Cambrai-Arras in the north of France c 830-863 (863)
 Saint Gormcal, Abbot of Ardoileán in Galway in Ireland (1016)

Post-Schism Orthodox saints

 Saint Theoctistus, Bishop of Chernigov (1123)
 Venerable Monk-martyr Job the Gorge-dweller (Job of Ushchelsk), on the Mezen River (Solovki) (1628)
 New Martyr Christos of Preveza, at Kos (1668)
 Venerable Eugenius of Aetolia (1682)
 Saint John Jacob the Chozebite, of Neamț (1960)  (see also: July 28 - Greek)

New martyrs and confessors

 New Hieromartyr Stephen Chitrov, Priest (1918)
 New Martyrs Eudocia Shikova, and Novices Daria Timolina, Daria Siushinskaya, and Maria, of Diveyevo Convent (1919)
 New Hieromartyr Simon (Shleyev), Bishop of Ufa (1921)
 New Hieromartyr John Smirnov, Deacon (1938)

Other commemorations

 Uncovering of the relics (1967) of St. Arsenius the New of Paros (1877)

Icon gallery

Notes

References

Sources
 August 5 / August 18. Orthodox Calendar (PRAVOSLAVIE.RU).
 August 18 / August 5. HOLY TRINITY RUSSIAN ORTHODOX CHURCH (A parish of the Patriarchate of Moscow).
 August 5. OCA - The Lives of the Saints.
 The Autonomous Orthodox Metropolia of Western Europe and the Americas (ROCOR). St. Hilarion Calendar of Saints for the year of our Lord 2004. St. Hilarion Press (Austin, TX). p. 57.
 Menologion: The Fifth Day of the Month of August. Orthodoxy in China.
 August 5. Latin Saints of the Orthodox Patriarchate of Rome.
 The Roman Martyrology. Transl. by the Archbishop of Baltimore. Last Edition, According to the Copy Printed at Rome in 1914. Revised Edition, with the Imprimatur of His Eminence Cardinal Gibbons. Baltimore: John Murphy Company, 1916. pp. 232-233.
 Rev. Richard Stanton. A Menology of England and Wales, or, Brief Memorials of the Ancient British and English Saints Arranged According to the Calendar, Together with the Martyrs of the 16th and 17th Centuries. London: Burns & Oates, 1892. pp. 380-382.

 Greek Sources
 Great Synaxaristes:  5 ΑΥΓΟΥΣΤΟΥ. ΜΕΓΑΣ ΣΥΝΑΞΑΡΙΣΤΗΣ.
  Συναξαριστής. 5 Αυγούστου. ECCLESIA.GR. (H ΕΚΚΛΗΣΙΑ ΤΗΣ ΕΛΛΑΔΟΣ).

 Russian Sources
  18 августа (5 августа). Православная Энциклопедия под редакцией Патриарха Московского и всея Руси Кирилла (электронная версия). (Orthodox Encyclopedia - Pravenc.ru).

August in the Eastern Orthodox calendar